Say It with Diamonds is a 1935 British comedy film directed by Redd Davis and starring Frank Pettingell, Eve Becke and Vera Bogetti.

It was shot as a quota quickie at Walton Studios for distribution by the British subsidiary of MGM.

Cast
 Frank Pettingell as Ezra Hopkins 
 Eve Becke as Sylvia 
 Vera Bogetti as Kay 
 Gerald Rawlinson as Richard 
 Eileen Munro as Fanny Hopkins 
 Ernest Sefton as Mocket 
 Arthur Finn as Montana

References

Bibliography
 Chibnall, Steve. Quota Quickies: The British of the British 'B' Film. British Film Institute, 2007.
 Low, Rachael. Filmmaking in 1930s Britain. George Allen & Unwin, 1985.
 Wood, Linda. British Films, 1927-1939. British Film Institute, 1986.

External links

1935 films
British comedy films
British black-and-white films
1935 comedy films
Films directed by Redd Davis
Films shot at Nettlefold Studios
Quota quickies
Metro-Goldwyn-Mayer films
1930s English-language films
1930s British films